Johanna Louise Karolina Burckhardt (22 August 1849 – 29 September 1935), professionally known as Jenny Burckhardt, was a Swiss painter.

References

1849 births
1935 deaths
19th-century Swiss painters
20th-century Swiss painters
Swiss women painters
20th-century Swiss women artists
19th-century Swiss women artists